Chamkar Samraong is a sangkat (previously khum/commune) of Battambang Municipality (previously Battambang District) in Battambang Province in north-western Cambodia.

Villages
Chamkar Samraong contains five villages.

References

Communes of Battambang province
Battambang District